Richard Tanne (born February 4, 1985) is an American filmmaker and actor. His critically acclaimed feature film debut Southside with You (2016), premiered at the Sundance Film Festival and received several accolades including a Gotham Award nomination for Breakthrough Director.

In 2020, Tanne released his second feature film, the Amazon Studios drama Chemical Hearts, which he wrote and directed. It received positive reviews.

Early life
Tanne was born and raised in the township of Livingston, New Jersey. He attended Livingston High School, graduating in 2003. He was raised Jewish.

As a teenager, Tanne's writing led to him being the recipient of the New Jersey Governor's Award for Excellence in Arts Education for playwriting. Following his initial success as a teenage writer, Tanne was announced as the winner of the Young Playwrights Inc. National Playwriting Competition, which was founded by Stephen Sondheim. Other recipients include filmmaker Kenneth Lonergan and playwright Rebecca Gilman.

Career

Early work 
Tanne became the host of Cinema Cool in 2010, and was also a co-creator of the movie talk show. His first major role as an actor came in 2011 in the TV movie, Swamp Shark. The film aired in 2011 on the SyFy Channel. He produced the Lionsgate horror film Mischief Night (2014) and played a lead role in the 2014 independent film Worst Friends, co-starring Kristen Connolly and Cody Horn.

Breakthrough and success 
In December 2014, it was announced that Tanne would make his feature directorial debut on the romance film Southside with You, for which he also wrote the script. The film is based on the first date of American President Barack Obama and his wife Michelle Obama, in Chicago, Illinois in 1989. Around the same time, Tika Sumpter was announced as cast in the role of Michelle Obama, and also co-produced. Principal photography on the film began on July 13, 2015 on location in Chicago, and wrapped on July 31, 2015.

Southside with You premiered at the 2016 Sundance Film Festival to critical acclaim and received numerous awards and nominations. It was released in North American theaters on August 26, 2016.

On June 14, 2019, Amazon Studios announced that production was underway in New Jersey on Chemical Hearts, a teenage coming-of-age, romance drama with Tanne writing, directing and producing and Lili Reinhart starring and executive producing. Tanne adapted the screenplay from Krystal Sutherland's novel, Our Chemical Hearts. The film was released on Amazon Prime to generally positive reviews on August 21, 2020.

Upcoming projects 
In October 2017, Deadline Hollywood reported that Tanne sold a genre pitch to Sony Pictures in a bidding war. Though the plot was not disclosed, Tanne is set to write and direct the film. It was also reported that he will next direct an original screenplay entitled Vienna.

Filmography

Film

Producer only 

 Mischief Night (2014)
 Worst Friends (2014)

Acting Roles

References

External links
 

Male actors from New Jersey
Film producers from New York (state)
American male screenwriters
Livingston High School (New Jersey) alumni
People from Livingston, New Jersey
American male film actors
State University of New York at Purchase alumni
Living people
21st-century American male actors
21st-century American male writers
Film directors from New Jersey
1985 births
Screenwriters from New Jersey
Film producers from New Jersey
Screenwriters from New York (state)
21st-century American screenwriters
Film directors from New York (state)
Male actors from New York (state)